Margaret Lee may refer to:

Margaret Lee (lady-in-waiting) (c.1506–c.1543), Thomas Wyatt's sister; Anne Boleyn's lady-in-waiting, friend and cousin
Margaret Lee (Hong Kong actress) (born 1962), Hong Kong actress, see Hong Kong Film Award for Best Supporting Actress
Margaret Lee (Singaporean actress) (born 1970), Singaporean actress
Margaret Lee (English actress) (born 1943), British actress who starred in Italian films
Margaret Lee (tennis), in 1961 to 1968 Wimbledon Championships – Women's Singles